Eating Out 2: Sloppy Seconds is a 2006 American sex comedy film directed by Phillip J. Bartell. It is a sequel to Eating Out. Jim Verraros, Rebekah Kochan, and Emily Brooke Hands reprise their roles from the first film, while Brett Chukerman replaces Ryan Carnes in the role of Marc. The film debuted at the Outfest film festival before a limited theatrical release.

Plot
Kyle (Jim Verraros) breaks up with Marc (Brett Chukerman), his love interest from the first movie, accusing him of flirting with hotter men. Kyle, Tiffani (Rebekah Kochan) and Gwen, friends from the first film, all become attracted to Troy (Marco Dapper), a chiseled farm boy from Troy, Illinois, who poses nude for their art class. Troy befriends and confides in them that he has slept with both women and men, but is reluctant to embrace any gay feelings. Kyle and the girls devise a scheme in which Kyle pretends to be an ex-gay who is dating Tiffani, to overcome Troy's inhibitions and get him to sleep with the both of them.

While Kyle and Troy start attending meetings with the campus ex-gay ministry, Marc notices Kyle becoming close with Troy and decides to try to seduce Troy himself. Troy eventually succumbs to Marc's advances during Gwen's homoerotic photo shoot, and the two fool around, but Marc cannot go through with it because he still has feelings for Kyle. Troy then overhears Gwen and Marc talking about the entire scheme.

Wanting to get back at the schemers, Troy visits Tiffani and Kyle because supposedly they have an "arrangement" that lets Kyle sleep with men. They attempt a threesome, but Troy gets his revenge by goading them into performing an uncomfortable act of cunnilingus first. Gwen and Marc storm into Kyle's house after witnessing the debacle, and Troy scolds the group for being so sex-crazed. Troy ultimately concludes that he is bisexual (to which everyone shouts out, "There's no such thing!", although they later accept it) and Kyle admits he was wrong to leave Marc.

The five then start scheming to out Jacob (Scott Vickaryous), the closeted leader of the ex-gay ministry, to his mother by tricking him to have sex with Octavio, another member of the ministry, in a portable toilet on wheels. Jacob finally comes out to his mother (after he inadvertently ejaculates on her coat as his sexuality is revealed), and flees with Octavio. Troy takes a liking to Tiffani and they start a relationship.

In the end, Marc and Kyle get back together after confessing their feelings to each other and start kissing. Gwen starts to date a girl experimentally.

Cast
 Jim Verraros as Kyle
 Emily Brooke Hands as Gwen Anderson
 Rebekah Kochan as Tiffani von der Sloot
 Brett Chukerman as Marc Everhard
 Marco Dapper as Troy
 Scott Vickaryous as Jacob
 Mink Stole as Helen
 Adrián Quiñonez as Octavio
 Jessie Gold as Violet Müfdaver
 Joseph Morales as Derek

Critical reception
Review aggregator Rotten Tomatoes reports that 44% of 16 professional critics gave the film a positive review."

Sequels

Eating Out 2: Sloppy Seconds was followed by Eating Out: All You Can Eat in 2009. Two additional sequels, Eating Out: Drama Camp and Eating Out: The Open Weekend were produced simultaneously and released in 2011.

References

External links
 

Eating Out (film series)
2006 films
2006 independent films
2006 LGBT-related films
2006 romantic comedy films
2000s sex comedy films
American independent films
American LGBT-related films
American romantic comedy films
American sequel films
American sex comedy films
2000s English-language films
Films shot in Los Angeles
Gay-related films
LGBT-related romantic comedy films
LGBT-related sex comedy films
Male bisexuality in film
2000s American films